Mike or Michael Wells may refer to:

Mike Wells (businessman) (born 1960), CEO of Athora
Mike Wells (defensive lineman) (born 1971), American football defensive lineman
Michael Wells (pathologist) (born 1952), president of the European Society of Pathology
Mike Wells (quarterback) (born 1951), American football quarterback
Michael Wells (rugby union) (born 1993), Australian rugby union player